"Never Let You Go" is a single performed by New Kids on the Block (as "NKOTB") from their 1994 album Face the Music. The song features Jordan Knight singing lead vocals and Donnie Wahlberg rapping. It reached number 42 on the UK Singles Chart and number 18 on Canada's The Record chart. The video for the song shows Knight and a young woman disputing during the majority of it as he walks aimlessly through the city reminiscing before Wahlberg reunites them. "Never Let You Go" was the last single New Kids on the Block released before their 2008 reunion.

Track listings
CD 1
 "Never Let You Go" (radio version)
 "Never Let You Go" (LP version)

CD 2
 "Never Let You Go" (radio version)
 "Never Let You Go" (LP version)
 "Keepin' My Fingers Crossed"

Charts

References

1993 songs
1994 singles
Columbia Records singles
New Kids on the Block songs
Song recordings produced by Leon Sylvers III
Song recordings produced by Teddy Riley
Songs written by Leon Sylvers III
Songs written by Teddy Riley